Lancelot Richard Pierre (5 June 1921 – 14 April 1989) was a West Indian cricketer who played in one Test match in 1948.

Pierre was a fast bowler who played for Trinidad from 1940–41 to 1949–50. He played the Third Test in Georgetown in 1947–48 against England, which West Indies won, though Pierre did not bat or take a wicket. He toured England in 1950, taking his best first-class figures of 8 for 51 against Lancashire.

References

External links

 Newsreel of West Indians in England in 1950

1921 births
1989 deaths
West Indies Test cricketers
Trinidad and Tobago cricketers